The 2021 Challenger Biel/Bienne was a professional tennis tournament played on indoor hard courts. It was the 1st edition of the tournament which was part of the 2021 ATP Challenger Tour. It took place in Biel/Bienne, Switzerland between 20 and 26 September 2021.

Singles main-draw entrants

Seeds

 1 Rankings are as of 13 September 2021.

Other entrants
The following players received wildcards into the singles main draw:
  Jérôme Kym
  Leandro Riedi
  Dominic Stricker

The following players received entry into the singles main draw as alternates:
  Matthias Bachinger
  Andrey Kuznetsov

The following players received entry from the qualifying draw:
  Antoine Escoffier
  Hiroki Moriya
  Jakub Paul
  Alexander Ritschard

The following player received entry as a lucky loser:
  Alexander Shevchenko

Champions

Singles

  Liam Broady def.  Marc-Andrea Hüsler 7–5, 6–3.

Doubles

  Ruben Bemelmans /  Daniel Masur def.  Marc-Andrea Hüsler /  Dominic Stricker Walkover.

References

2021 ATP Challenger Tour
2021 in Swiss tennis
September 2021 sports events in Switzerland